Nizhneudinsk (Doodo-Üde) is a town and the administrative center of Nizhneudinsky District of Irkutsk Oblast, Russia, located on the Uda River (Yenisei's basin),  northwest of Irkutsk, the administrative center of the oblast. Population:    39,700 (1970).

History
It was founded in 1648 and granted town status in 1783. Nizhneudinsk was so named to distinguish it from Verkhneudinsk (now Ulan-Ude).

Administrative and municipal status
Within the framework of administrative divisions, Nizhneudinsk serves as the administrative center of Nizhneudinsky District, to which it is directly subordinated. As a municipal division, the town of Nizhneudinsk is incorporated within Nizhneudinsky Municipal District as Nizhneudinskoye Urban Settlement.

Economy

Transportation
The town stands on the Trans-Siberian Railway and is served by a small airport, ICAO code UINN.

Military
In 1987, the 91st Motor Rifle Division was withdrawn from Mongolia and arrived at Nizhneudinsk. Later that year it became a Territorial Education Center, and then a Base for Storage of Weapons and Equipment. It was redesignated twice before becoming the 187th Base for Storage of Weapons and Equipment. The 187th Base for Storage and Repair of Weapons and Equipment of the Central Military District is based in the town.

Climate
Nizhneudinsk has a subarctic climate (Köppen climate classification Dwc), with long, severely cold winters and short, warm summers. Precipitation is quite low but is much higher in summer than at other times of the year.

References

Notes

Sources

Registry of the Administrative-Territorial Formations of Irkutsk Oblast

External links

Cities and towns in Irkutsk Oblast
Irkutsk Governorate
Populated places established in 1648
1648 establishments in Russia